Adcash is a worldwide advertising platform based in Tallinn, Estonia.

History
Adcash was founded in 2007 by Christophe Avignon and Thomas Padovani. Padovani, who is originally from France, came to Estonia to establish the new company. The company was started with no direct funding, with the first sales agreements obtained through direct sales.

The Adcash Advertising Network was spun off as a separate company, Adcash OÜ, in 2011. It remains a subsidiary of Webinfluence Group AS.

In 2012, the company's turnover was €11,7 million followed by growth in 2013 seeing revenues at almost €25 million.

Recognition

In 2015, Adcash was awarded two titles at the EAS gala dinner of Estonia's best companies. The first title was for the Innovator of the Year, and the second for the most competitive medium-sized enterprise in Estonia.

References

External links

Estonian companies established in 2007
Internet properties established in 2007
Marketing companies established in 2007
Online advertising services and affiliate networks
Estonian brands